The list of ship commissionings in 1965 includes a chronological list of all ships commissioned in 1965.


See also 

1965
 Ship commissionings